The Algic languages (also Algonquian–Wiyot–Yurok or Algonquian–Ritwan) are an indigenous language family of North America. Most Algic languages belong to the Algonquian subfamily, dispersed over a broad area from the Rocky Mountains to Atlantic Canada. The other Algic languages are the Yurok and Wiyot of northwestern California, which, despite their geographic proximity, are not closely related. All these languages descend from Proto-Algic, a second-order proto-language estimated to have been spoken about 7,000 years ago and reconstructed using the reconstructed Proto-Algonquian language and the Wiyot and Yurok languages.

History 
The term Algic was first coined by Henry Schoolcraft in his Algic Researches, published in 1839. Schoolcraft defined the term as "derived from the words Allegheny and Atlantic, in reference to the indigenous people anciently located in this geographical area." Schoolcraft's terminology was not retained. The peoples he called "Algic" were later included among the speakers of Algonquian languages. This language group is also referred to as "Algonquian-Ritwan" and "Wiyot-Yurok-Algonquian."

When Edward Sapir proposed that the well-established Algonquian family was genetically related to the Wiyot and Yurok languages of northern California, he applied the term Algic to this larger family. The Algic urheimat is thought to have been located in the Northwestern United States somewhere between the suspected homeland of the Algonquian branch (to the west of Lake Superior according to Goddard) and the earliest known location of the Wiyot and Yurok (along the middle Columbia River according to Whistler).

Classification of Algic 
The genetic relation of Wiyot and Yurok to Algonquian was first proposed by Edward Sapir (1913, 1915, 1923), and argued against by Algonquianist Truman Michelson (1914, 1914, 1935). According to Lyle Campbell (1997), the relationship "has subsequently been demonstrated to the satisfaction of all." This controversy in the early classification of North American languages was called the "Ritwan controversy" because Wiyot and Yurok were assigned to a genetic grouping called "Ritwan." Most specialists now reject the validity of the Ritwan genetic node. Berman (1982) suggested that Wiyot and Yurok share sound changes not shared by the rest of Algic (which would be explainable by either areal diffusion or genetic relatedness); Proulx (2004) argued against Berman's conclusion of common sound changes.

More recently, Sergei Nikolaev has argued in two papers for a systematic relationship between the Nivkh language of Sakhalin and the Amur river basin and the Algic languages, and a secondary relationship between these two together and the Wakashan languages.

Proto-language

See also 
Algonquian–Wakashan languages

References

Bibliography

Journals and books 

 
 
 
 
 
 
 
Michelson, Truman. 1915. Rejoinder. American Anthropologist, n.s. 17:194–198.
 
  (hbk); .
 
 
 
 
 
 
 
 
 
 
 
 
 
 
 

 
Language families
Indigenous languages of the North American Subarctic
Indigenous languages of California
Indigenous languages of the North American Plains
Indigenous languages of the North American eastern woodlands
Indigenous languages of the North American Southeast
Algonquian–Wakashan languages
Endangered Algic languages